Minuscule 446 (in the Gregory-Aland numbering), ε 507 (in the Soden numbering), is a Greek minuscule manuscript of the New Testament, on parchment. Palaeographically it has been assigned to the 15th century. The text represents the Byzantine textual tradition. The manuscript was prepared for liturgical use.

Description 

The codex contains almost complete text of the four Gospels on 228 parchment leaves with some lacunae (Matthew 1:1-17; 26:47-27:40; Mark 1:1-9; Luke 1:1-18; John 1:1-21). All lacunae were made by a man who mischievously cut out the ornamented headpieces at the beginning of each Gospel. In modern time two unfoliated parchment leaves, and two paper fly-leaves were added at the beginning and end.

The text is written in one column per page, in 25 lines per page. The letters are clearly but unskilfully written. The manuscript is decorated, with geometric, occasionally with zoomorphic decorations, in brown and red. The initial letters, titles, colophons, and rubrics in red.

There is also a division according to the smaller Ammonian Sections (in Mark 232 sections, last in 16:6). It has no references to the Eusebian Canons.

Text 

The Greek text of the codex is a representative of the Byzantine text-type. Aland placed it in Category V. According to the Claremont Profile Method it represents textual family Kx in Luke 1 (fragmentary), Luke 10, and Luke 20. It belongs also to the textual cluster 1213 (minuscule 1213 is the lead manuscript of this cluster).

History 

The original manuscript contained dated colophon, but it was erased by a later hand. The manuscript is dated by the INTF to the 15th century. The manuscript probably was rewritten from minuscule 65.

The manuscript was brought by John Covel, British chaplain, from Constantinople to England (along with minuscule 110 and other manuscripts). It was designated as Covel's 5. Then – in 1715 or 1716 – the manuscript was sold to Robert Harley, and to his son Edward Harley. In 1753 it was purchased along with other manuscripts of collection by the British Museum.

The manuscript was added to the list of New Testament manuscripts by Scholz (1794-1852). It was examined by Covell, Scholz (only Mark 5), Bloomfield, and C. R. Gregory in 1883.

The manuscript was rebound in 1964.

It is currently housed at the British Library (Harley MS 5777).

See also 

 List of New Testament minuscules
 Biblical manuscript
 Textual criticism

References

Further reading 

 Cyril Ernest Wright, Fontes Harleiani: A Study of the Sources of the Harleian Collection of Manuscripts in the British Museum (London: British Museum, 1972), pp. 116, 462.
 Summary Catalogue of Greek Manuscripts (London: British Library, 1999- ), I, p. 189.

External links 
 Harleian 5777 at the British Library

Greek New Testament minuscules
15th-century biblical manuscripts
Harleian Collection